Mount Majestic is a  mountain in Victoria, Australia, primarily within the town of Cockatoo.

The area near Mount Majestic it is quite sparsely populated, with 34 inhabitants per square kilometre. The nearest major community is Berwick, about 15 kilometres to the southwest.

Vegetation in the area of the mountain is primarily evergreen decidious forest.

See also

 List of mountains in Victoria

References

Majestic